The Hackney is a recognized breed of horse that was developed in Great Britain. In recent decades, the breeding of the Hackney has been directed toward producing horses that are ideal for carriage driving. They are an elegant high stepping breed of carriage horse that is popular for showing in harness events. Hackneys possess good stamina, and are capable of trotting at high speed for extended periods of time.

Breed history
The Hackney Horse breed was developed in the 14th century in Norfolk when the King of England required powerful but attractive horses with an excellent trot, to be used for general purpose riding horses. Since roads were rudimentary in those times, Hackneys were a primary riding horse, riding being the common mode of equine transportation.  The trotting horses were more suitable as war horses than amblers with their pacing gaits. As a result, in 1542 King Henry VIII required his wealthy subjects keep a specified number of trotting horse stallions for breeding use.

In about 1729 a Norfolk Trotter stallion and an Arabian stallion contributed to the foundation stock for the modern Hackney Horse. The resulting Norfolk Roadster, as it was known, was a heavily built horse that was used as a work horse by farmers and others. It was also a fast horse with good stamina.

Another famous horse was the stallion Original Shales, foaled in East Anglia in 1755. He was by the stallion Blaze, the son of the famous undefeated racehorse, Flying Childers who was a grandson of the great Darley Arabian (one of the three foundation stallions of the Thoroughbred breed). Original Shales sired two stallions—Scot Shales and Driver—both of which had a great influence on the Norfolk Trotter.

Messenger (GB), a 1780 grandson of Sampson, was a foundation sire of the present American Standardbred horse. Hambletonian 10 had at least three crosses of Messenger in the third and fourth generations of his pedigree (3x4x4). In the 1820s "Norfolk Cob" was recorded as having done 2 miles in 5 minutes 4 seconds and was one of the famous horses of that breed along with "Nonpareil," who was driven 100 miles in 9 hours 56 minutes 57 seconds.

In 1820 Bellfounder a Norfolk Trotter stallion who was able to trot 17 miles in an hour with 14 stone up, was exported to America where he was the damsire of Hambletonian 10.  In this era, match-trotters competed under saddle, not harness. Later with improvements in roads, the Hackney was also used in harness, and he was then a riding and driving horse of high merit.

Robert and Philip Ramsdale, father and son, took the Norfolk horses Wroot's Pretender and Phenomenon to Yorkshire, where they bred them with Yorkshire trotting mares. In July 1800, the celebrated Hackney mare, Phenomenon, was backed to trot 17 miles in 56 minutes for a bet of £400, which she did in 53 minutes. In 1832, one of Phenomenon's daughters, the 14  hands Phenomena, trotted 17 miles in only 53 minutes. During the 19th century, with the expansion of the railway, the Norfolk breed fell out of favour, to be revived later by the Hackney Horse Society. The Norfolk and Yorkshire Trotter were selectively bred for elegant style and speed, and were developed into the modern Hackney Horse. The brilliant gaits of the Hackney Horse, however, saved it from extinction, and began its use in the show ring. They are still extremely successful in harness, and can also produce very nice riding horses, many known for their ability in show jumping and dressage competition.

In 1883, the Hackney Horse Society was formed in Norwich and the society’s  stud book has records dating back to 1755 in the Hackney Stud Book.

Alexander Cassatt was responsible for the introduction of the Hackney Pony to the United States. In 1878 he acquired 239 Stella in Britain and brought her to Philadelphia. In 1891, Cassatt and other Hackney enthusiasts founded the American Hackney Horse Society which is based in Lexington, Kentucky.

Hackneys come in both pony and horse height ranges, and are one of the few breeds that recognize both pony and horse sizes. The Hackney Pony was developed in the late 19th century, when Hackney horses were bred to various pony breeds in order to create a very specific type of show pony.

Breed characteristics

The Hackney Horse's height ranges from 14.2 hands (147 centimetres) to 16.2 hands (168 cm) tall. They may be any solid colour, including bay, brown, chestnut and black. Hackneys often have white markings, often due to the influence of sabino genetics.

The Hackney has a well-shaped head, sometimes with a slightly convex nose. Their eyes and ears are expressive and should show alertness.  The neck is crested and muscular with a clean cut throat and jaw. The chest is broad and well-defined, the shoulder is powerful, long and gently sloping. The Hackneys have an average length of back, muscular, level croups, and powerful hindquarters. Their ribs are well-sprung. The tail is set high and carried high naturally. The legs are strong with broad, clean joints, long forearms and gaskins, with strong hocks, and pasterns medium in length, and are attached to round, fairly upright hooves.

In the trot, they exhibit showiness and an exaggerated high knee and hock action due to very good flexion of their joints. Their action should be straight and true with a distinct moment of suspension. The front legs reach up high with sharply bent knees that are stretched well forward with a ground covering stride. Their hind legs are well propelled underneath them in a similar exaggerated action. In addition to inherent soundness and endurance, the Hackney Horse has proven to be a breed with an easy, rhythmic canter, and a brisk, springy walk.
 
Hackneys have been exported into Australia, the United States and the Netherlands.

In April 2022 the Rare Breeds Survival Trust declared the breed was at risk, with just 31 breeding females and 12 males left in the UK.

References

The Encyclopedia of Horses & Ponies, by Tamsin Pickeral, Barnes & Noble Books, p. 311.

External links

 American Hackney Horse Society
 Hackney Horse and Pony
 Hackney Horse Society 

Horse breeds originating in England
Horse breeds
Conservation Priority Breeds of the Livestock Conservancy
Animal breeds on the RBST Watchlist